Maria's Day is a 1984 Hungarian drama film directed by Judit Elek. It was screened in the Un Certain Regard section at the 1984 Cannes Film Festival.

Cast
 Edit Handel - Júlia Szendrey
 Éva Igó - Marika Szendrey
 Sándor Szabó - Ignác Szendrey
 Imre Csiszár - Pál Gyulai
 Tamás Fodor - Árpád Horvát
 Lajos Kovács - István Petőfi
 Gábor Svidrony - Child of Júlia
 György Rácz - Child of Júlia
 Kati Bulcsu - Child of Júlia
 Peter Farkas
 Edit Illés
 Csaba Oszkay
 Szilvia Zsidai

References

External links

1984 films
1980s Hungarian-language films
1984 drama films
Films directed by Judit Elek
Hungarian drama films